Edward James “Teddy” Rowe (born 17 October 2003) is an English footballer who currently plays as a midfielder for Aston Villa.

Career 
Rowe joined the Aston Villa youth setup at the under-9 level. He was one of several scholars who were fast-tracked into the under-18 squad in July 2020.

On 8 January 2021, Rowe made his first team debut for Aston Villa as a substitute in a FA Cup third round tie against Liverpool,  after Villa had been forced to name a team of inexperienced academy players after a COVID-19 outbreak had affected the first team.

On 7 July 2022, Rowe signed his first professional contract with Aston Villa.

Career statistics

Club

Notes

References

2003 births
Living people
English footballers
Association football midfielders
Aston Villa F.C. players